22nd Street is an east–west street passing through the  Noe Valley, Mission, and Potrero Hill districts of San Francisco, California. The street is discontinuous and exists in several sections: the main western section between Hoffman Avenue and the Bayshore Freeway, a segment from Vermont Street to Wisconsin Street, a short alley off of Missouri Street, and an eastern section from Texas Street to Pier 70. Below the elevated Interstate 280 and at-grade eastern section lies 22nd Street station, Caltrain's only station beneath ground level.

Steepness
It is one of the steepest streets in the city. In the 250-foot block from Vicksburg to Church Streets in the Noe Valley neighborhood, the city map shows a 79-foot descent along the south side of the street ( along the north side) for an average grade of just over 31%, about the same as the steepest block of Filbert Street in San Francisco. (Both streets are one-way down; bottom of the 22nd St hill at  A 1956 view seems to show a two-way street.)

See also 
 22nd Street (Caltrain station)
 Baldwin Street, Dunedin — the world's steepest residential street.

References 

Streets in San Francisco
Mission District, San Francisco
Potrero Hill, San Francisco